Cupressus sempervirens, the Mediterranean cypress (also known as Italian cypress, Tuscan cypress, Persian cypress, or pencil pine), is a species of cypress native to the eastern Mediterranean region, in northeast Libya, southern Albania, southern and coastal Bulgaria, southern Ukraine (Crimea), southern coastal Croatia and Slovenia, southern Montenegro, southern Bosnia and Herzegovina, southwestern North Macedonia, southern Greece, southern Turkey, Cyprus, northern Egypt, western Syria, Lebanon, Malta, Italy, southern France, Spain, Palestine, Israel, western Jordan, South Caucasus, and also a disjunct population in Iran.

Description
Cupressus sempervirens is a medium-sized coniferous evergreen tree to 35 m (115 ft) tall, with a conic crown with level branches and variably loosely hanging branchlets. It is very long-lived, with some trees reported to be over 1,000 years old.

The foliage grows in dense sprays, dark green in colour. The leaves are scale-like, 2–5 mm long, and produced on rounded (not flattened) shoots. The seed cones are ovoid or oblong, 25–40 mm long, with 10-14 scales, green at first, maturing brown about 20–24 months after pollination. The male cones are 3–5 mm long, and release pollen in late winter. It is moderately susceptible to cypress canker, caused by the fungus Seiridium cardinale, and can suffer extensive dieback where this disease is common. The species name sempervirens comes from the Latin for 'evergreen'.

It is also known as "the churchyard cypress," from being often found standing (as if sentinels) surrounding a graveyard.

Uses
Mediterranean cypress has been widely cultivated as an ornamental tree for millennia away from its native range, mainly throughout the whole Mediterranean region, and in other areas with similar hot, dry summers and mild, rainy winters, including California, southwest South Africa and southern Australia. It can also be grown successfully in areas with cooler, moister summers, such as the British Isles, New Zealand and the Pacific Northwest (coastal Oregon, Washington and British Columbia). It is also planted in Florida and parts of the coastal southern United States as an ornamental tree. In some areas, particularly the United States, it is known as "Italian" or "Tuscan cypress". Commonly seen throughout New Mexico, the Mediterranean cypress is also known as the "drama tree" because of its tendency to bend with even the slightest of breezes.

The vast majority of the trees in cultivation are selected cultivars with a fastigiate crown, with erect branches forming a narrow to very narrow crown often less than a tenth as wide as the tree is tall. The dark green "exclamation mark" shape of these trees is a highly characteristic signature of Mediterranean town and village landscapes. Formerly, the species was sometimes separated into two varieties, the wild C. sempervirens var. sempervirens (syn. var. horizontalis), and the fastigiate C. s. var. pyramidalis (syn. var. fastigiata, var. stricta), but the latter is now only distinguished as a Cultivar Group, with no botanical significance.

It is also known for its very durable, scented wood, used most famously for the doors of St. Peter's Basilica in the Vatican City, Rome. Cypress used to be used in distilleries as staves to hold mash ferments to make alcohol before the invention of stainless steel.

In cosmetics it is used as astringent, firming, anti-seborrheic, anti-dandruff, anti-aging and as fragrance. It is also the traditional wood used for Italian harpsichords.

In culture

Iran

Iranians considered cypress to be a relic of Zoroaster, and they believed that Vishtaspa ordered to plant this cypress after converting to Zoroaster.
In the words of the Shahnameh, cypress represents a single-minded, professional and wise man. 
In ancient Iran, at Yalda night, a tree called Yalda tree was decorated, which was generally made of cypress and pine trees. It is said that the decoration of cypress and pine in Christmas was adapted from ancient Iran, because the Iranians looked at these two trees, especially the cypress, as a symbol of resistance against darkness and cold, and they stood in front of the cypress on the first day of January. And they vowed to be strong and stable until the next year and plant another cedar sapling.
Also, according to Iranian beliefs, greens at the beginning of the year are a sign of blessing throughout that year, and based on this belief, the custom of planting greens at the beginning of the year and at the same time as Nowruz celebration gradually replaced the Cypress tree.
Cypress, Cupressus sempervirens, was the first choice for Iranian gardens. In all of the famous Persian Gardens, such as Fin Garden, Shazdeh Garden, Dowlat-Abad, and others, this tree plays a central role in their design. The oldest living cypress is the Sarv-e-Abarkooh in Iran's Yazd Province. Its age is estimated to be approximately 4,000 years.

Symbolism
In classical antiquity, the cypress was a symbol of mourning and in the modern era it remains the principal cemetery tree in both the Muslim world and Europe. In the classical tradition, the cypress was associated with death and the underworld because it failed to regenerate when cut back too severely. Athenian households in mourning were garlanded with boughs of cypress. Cypress was used to fumigate the air during cremations. It was among the plants that were suitable for making wreaths to adorn statues of Pluto, the classical ruler of the underworld.

The poet Ovid, who wrote during the reign of Augustus, records the best-known myth that explains the association of the cypress with grief. The handsome boy Cyparissus, a favorite of Apollo, accidentally killed a beloved tame stag. His grief and remorse were so inconsolable that he asked to weep forever. He was transformed into cupressus sempervirens, with the tree's sap as his tears. In another version of the story, it was the woodland god Silvanus who was the divine companion of Cyparissus and who accidentally killed the stag. When the boy was consumed by grief, Silvanus turned him into a tree, and thereafter carried a branch of cypress as a symbol of mourning.

In Greek mythology, besides Cyparissus, the cypress is also associated with Artemis and Hecate, a goddess of magic, crossroads and the underworld. Ancient Roman funerary rites used it extensively.

The most famous Muslim cemetery in Turkey where C. sempervirens is used widely is Istanbul Karacaahmet Cemetery. In Istanbul Turkish the tree is referred to as "mezarlık servisi" (cemetery tree); its common name in Turkish and the name used in Turkish forestry is "kara selvi" (black cypress). Cypresses are mentioned extensively in the Shahnameh, the great Iranian epic poem by Ferdowsi.

In Jewish tradition, the cypress was held to be the wood used to build Noah's Ark and The Temple, and is mentioned as an idiom or metaphor in biblical passages, either referencing the tree's shape as an example of uprightness or its evergreen nature as an example of eternal beauty or health. It is popular in modern Israeli cemeteries, with contemporary explanation being that its shape resembles a candle and its being an evergreen symbolized the immortality of the soul.

In popular culture the Italian cypress is often stereotypically associated with vacation destinations to the Mediterranean region; Italy in particular.  The tree has been seen on travel posters for decades.

Other characteristics
In July 2012, a forest fire, lasting five days, devastated 20,000 hectares of forest in the Valencian village of Andilla. However, amid the charred landscape, a group of 946 cypress trees about 22 years old was virtually unharmed, and only 12 cypresses were burned. Andilla cypresses were planted by the CypFire European project studying various aspects of the cypresses, including fire resistance.

References

Further reading
 Farjon, A. 2013 Cupressus sempervirens. The IUCN Red List of Threatened Species. Version 2014.2
 Farjon, A. (2005). Monograph of Cupressaceae and Sciadopitys. Royal Botanic Gardens, Kew. .
 
 Panconesi, A. 2007 The cypress from myth to future. [Italian] 456 p. Ed. Centro Promozione Pubblicità,

External links

 Cupressus sempervirens—information, genetic conservation units and related resources from the European Forest Genetic Resources Programme (EUFORGEN)

sempervirens
Flora of Turkey
Garden plants of Europe
Ornamental trees
Plants described in 1753
Taxa named by Carl Linnaeus
Trees of Europe
Trees of Mediterranean climate
Trees of Western Asia
Flora of Malta
Flora of the Mediterranean Basin